The Livingston Group (TLG) is the lobbying firm founded by former Congressman Bob Livingston in 1999 after he stepped down as Speaker-elect and resigned his seat. TLG describes its services on its official website, saying it provides comprehensive public affairs, government relations and lobbying services on a global basis. Recognized as one of the most respected bipartisan government relations firms in Washington, D.C., TLG also provides marketing services (including access to venture capital and product tie-in referrals) and public affairs counsel in the areas of coalition building and strategic communications.

The firm has a network of over forty (40) principals, consultants, and international associates, including former members of political staffs, and corporate executives.  The firm's partners are Livingston and two former staff members, J. Allen Martin and Paul Cambon, who worked for him when he was a Congressman, and veteran congressional staff and government affairs professionals Bernie Robinson and Brian Glackin.

The firm's "senior counselors" are:
 Ted Malloch, Author and consultant

As of 2020, TLG has over thirty (30) domestic and foreign clients and is based in Washington, D.C., and then several other associate offices around the U.S. and throughout the world.

According to their website in September 2016, some of their more prominent clients included Verizon, Tulane University, Oracle, and Rush University Medical Center. In 2006, they obtained a Free Trade Agreement for Morocco and from 2006 to 2009 represented Azerbaijan, formerly part of the Soviet Union.

In 2008, the firm represented the Libya government of Muammar al-Gaddafi, and normalized relations between the United States and Libya following delivery of Libya's nuclear weaponry to the United States. Subsequently, TLG terminated their relationship with Libya in September 2009. It joined with Former Democratic Congressman Toby Moffett and DC Lobbyist Tony Podesta to represent the Republic of Egypt from 2007 to 2012.

In July 2005, Public Citizen published a report entitled "The Journey from Congress to K Street" which included a case study of The Livingston Group. It noted that the group grew into the 12th largest non-law lobbying firm, earning nearly $40 million between 1999 and 2004.  During roughly the same time period, Livingston, his wife, and his two political action committees (PACs) contributed over $500,000 to the PACs or campaign funds of various candidates.

In 2010, the 911 Health Bill, or the Zadroga Bill, for First Responders was the last Bill passed by both US House and Senate in the 111th Congress. Representing the major contractors involved in the clean-up of the 911 disaster site, The Livingston Group, was the only non-union lobbyist promoting the Bill.

In August 2009, The Livingston Group was mentioned in the bribery trial of Mose Jefferson, as one of TLG's clients, JRL Enterprises, was the supplier of education software which Mose Jefferson sold on commission under a separate contract.

Notes

External links 
 

Livingston Group